Wujiang District (Suzhounese: Wukaon Chiu), formerly Wujiang City, is one of five urban districts in Suzhou, Jiangsu province. As the southernmost county-level division of Jiangsu, it borders Shanghai to the northeast and Zhejiang province to the south and southwest. The total area of Wujiang is 1176.68 square kilometers, with a population of 1.5 million. Wujiang is currently one of the most economically successful cities in China. Songling, a town located at the centre of Wujiang, serves as the seat of the district government.

Geography
A portion of Lake Tai is situated in Wujiang district. Numerous historical canals are located in Wujiang district. Historic Lili village is located in Wujiang. The government has announced that Wujiang will be designated as Taihu New City.

Administration divisions
In the present, Wujiang District has 1 subdistrict and 8 towns.

Subdistrict
 Binhu

Town
 
 Lili 
 Qidu
 Shengze
 Pingwang
 Songling
 Taoyuan 
 Tongli
 Zhenze

Economy
Wujiang currently ranks as one of the most economically successful cities in China. Its GDP in 2007 was 61.8 billion yuan, an increase of 24.4% from 2006. The GDP per capita reached 78,149 yuan (ca. US$10,700) in 2007, an increase of 21.6% from the previous year. The city is home to more than 1,300 foreign enterprises with a total registered investment of US$10 billion.

Sports

The 15,000-capacity Wujiang Stadium is located in the Wujiang District. It is used mostly for association football.

Twin towns – sister cities
Wujiang has eight sister cities:

 Bourgoin-Jallieu, France
 Chiba, Japan
 Dubbo, Australia
 Hwaseong, South Korea
 Marlboro, United States
 Mogale, South Africa
 Südwestpfalz, Germany
 Uchinada, Japan

See also
 Tongli

References

External links
Wujiang City English guide (Jiangsu.NET)
http://www.foho.gov.cn/cn/newsqye.aspx
http://www.jshb.gov.cn/jshbw/wrfz/qjsc/zdqysh/201011/t20101101_162581.html

 
County-level divisions of Jiangsu
Administrative divisions of Suzhou